Doaba was a constituency of the Uttar Pradesh Legislative Assembly covering the city of Bairia in the Ballia district of Uttar Pradesh, India.

Doaba was one of five assembly constituencies in the Ballia (Lok Sabha constituency). After 2008, this constituency has been replaced by the Bairia Assembly Constituency.

Members of the Legislative Assembly 
Source:

See also 

 Bairia (Assembly Constituency)
 Ballia (Lok Sabha Constituency)
 Ballia District
 Uttar Pradesh
 Uttar Pradesh Legislative Assembly

References

External links
 

Ballia district
Former assembly constituencies of Uttar Pradesh
Constituencies disestablished in 2012
Constituencies established in 1974
1974 establishments in Uttar Pradesh
2012 disestablishments in India